1842 in archaeology

Explorations
 Site of Masada discovered.
 Karl Richard Lepsius begins an expedition to Egypt and the Sudan commissioned by King Frederick William IV of Prussia.

Excavations

Finds

Publications
 W. F. Ainsworth publishes the first report on Üçayak Byzantine Church.
 Karl Lepsius produces the first modern list of pyramids.
 David Roberts begins publication of The Holy Land, Syria, Idumea, Arabia, Egypt, and Nubia (chromolithographs).
 First known use of the term "Industrial archaeology".

Births
 12 January: Teoberto Maler, Mayanist

Deaths

See also
 List of years in archaeology
 1841 in archaeology
 1843 in archaeology

References

1842 archaeological discoveries
Archaeology by year
Archaeology